The following highways are numbered 569:

United States